7 Little Johnstons is an American reality television series that premiered January 6, 2015 and airs on the TLC. The series revolves around the Johnstons, a family of seven that lives with dwarfism.

Cast
Trent Johnston
Amber Johnston
Jonah Trent Johnston
Elizabeth Renee Johnston
Anna Marie Johnston
Alex Joseph Johnston
Emma Lee Johnston

Episodes

Series overview

Season 1 (2015)

Season 2 (2015)

Season 3 (2017)

Season 4 (2017)

Season 5 (2018)

Season 6 (2019)

Season 7 (2020)

Season 8 (2020–21)

Season 9 (2021)

Season 10 (2021–22)

Season 11 (2022)

Season 12 (2022)

References

External links 
 

2010s American reality television series
2015 American television series debuts
English-language television shows
Television series about children
Television series about families
TLC (TV network) original programming
Television shows about dwarfism